Klępie Górne  is a village in the administrative district of Gmina Stopnica, within Busko County, Świętokrzyskie Voivodeship, in south-central Poland.

The village has an approximate population of 340.

In 2018, Jewish gravestones were found in Klępie Górne, and moved to a Jewish cemetery in Busko-Zdrój.

References

Villages in Busko County